The Magic Gloves is a 2003 Argentine drama and comedy film directed by Martín Rejtman.  The film stars Vicentico, Valeria Bertuccelli, Diego Olivera, Fabián Arenillas, Cecilia Biagini and Susana Pampín. The film premiered at the Locarno Film Festival on 12 August 2003, followed by a premiere on 8 September at the 2003 Toronto International Film Festival. It received a theatrical release in Argentina on 27 May 2004.

Plot summary
Alejandro (Vicentico), a cab driver, and his girlfriend Cecilia are in the midst of breaking up when they become adopted by a social group led by a bossy husband and wife team, Sergio (Fabián Arenillas) and Susana (Susana Pampín). Alejandro briefly abandons his cab driving career to join an investment in plastic gloves along with Sergio and Sergio's brother, Luis, a porn star who has been working in Canada.

Reception
Writing for The Village Voice, J. Hoberman praised the film; "The Magic Gloves is a city symphony in which the metropolis seems an illusory maze and the melody is based on a refrain of recurring riffs." Dan Sallitt writing in Senses of Cinema wrote that "The Magic Gloves pushes the deadpan style of Spanish comedy so far that the abstraction comes out the other end."

Cast
Vicentico as Alejandro
Valeria Bertuccelli as Valeria
Fabián Arenillas as Sergio
Cecilia Biagini as Cecilia
Susana Pampín as Susana
Diego Olivera as Luis
Leonardo Azamor as Daniel
Pietr Krysav as Hugh
Denis Lukin as Kevin
Yelena Goreyeva as Laura
Darío Levy as Otorrinolaringólogo

References

External links
 

2000s Spanish-language films
2003 films
2003 comedy-drama films
Films shot in Argentina
Films directed by Martín Rejtman
2003 comedy films
2003 drama films
Argentine comedy-drama films
2000s Argentine films